Quaking homolog, KH domain RNA binding (mouse), also known as QKI, is a protein which in humans is encoded by the QKI gene.

QKI belongs to a family of RNA-binding proteins called STAR proteins for Signal Transduction and Activation of RNA. They have an HNRNPK homology (KH) domain embedded in a 200-amino acid region called the GSG domain. Other members of this family include SAM68 (KHDRBS1) and SF1 . Two more new members are KHDRBS3 and KHDRBS2.

The QKI gene is implicated as being important in schizophrenia, and QKI controls translation of many oligodendrocyte-related genes.

References

Further reading